Bhaaryayum Kaamukiyum is a 1978 Indian Malayalam film,  directed by J. Sasikumar. The film stars Prem Nazir, Sheela, Adoor Bhasi and Sreelatha Namboothiri in the lead roles. The film has musical score by M. K. Arjunan.

Cast
Prem Nazir
Sheela
Adoor Bhasi
Sreelatha Namboothiri
K. R. Vijaya
Meena
Nellikode Bhaskaran

Soundtrack
The music was composed by M. K. Arjunan and the lyrics were written by Chirayinkeezhu Ramakrishnan Nair and Sreekumaran Thampi.

References

External links
 

1978 films
1970s Malayalam-language films
Films directed by J. Sasikumar